The battle of al-Shihr was a conflict between the Ottoman admiral Khoja Zufar and Portuguese forces that arrived at the port of al-Shihr in 1531.

In 1530 Mustafa Bey and Khoja Zufar arrived at the port of al-Shihr in Yemen. The Ottomans advised the Sultan of al-Shihr, Badr, to not submit to the Portuguese and left cannons and 100 levends with the Sultan of al-Shihr. Mustafa Bey left al-Shihr in December 1530 while Khoja Zufar remained with Badr. A Portuguese force of 9 sails led by Manoel de Vasconcellos immediately arrived at the port of al-Shihr, however, Khoja Zufar prevented the Portuguese from entering al-Shihr, he defeated and drove out the Portuguese forces.

See also
 Battle of al-Shihr (1548)

References

Battles involving the Ottoman Empire
1531 in military history
1531 in Portugal
1531 in the Ottoman Empire